House of Gold & Bones – Part 1 is the fourth studio album by American rock band Stone Sour, and is the first of two consecutive albums to feature the House of Gold & Bones concept. Its reprises are featured on the second House of Gold & Bones album, which was released in 2013. It is the first Stone Sour album without bass player Shawn Economaki, who left the band in 2012.

Development
Stone Sour started working on the album on March 19, 2012 and Corey Taylor stated that the album would likely end up being a double album or concept album. It was later confirmed by the band that the songs would form a concept and would be released as two separate albums. Musically, Taylor also described the album's sound as "Pink Floyd's The Wall meets Alice in Chains' Dirt". It was also revealed that bassist Shawn Economaki was no longer in the band and that his studio replacement was Rachel Bolan from Skid Row.

Marketing
On August 24, 2012, Stone Sour released both "Gone Sovereign" and "Absolute Zero". On October 11, 2012, the band released a music video for "Gone Sovereign", that features their current tour bassist Johny Chow.

Release
House of Gold & Bones – Part 1 was released on October 22, 2012.  It debuted at number-seven on the Billboard 200 music album charts, shipping an estimated 31,000 copies in its first week of release.

The album has sold just under 130,000 copies in the United States

Critical reception

House of Gold and Bones – Part 1 received critical acclaim from critics, receiving a 79/100 over rating from music aggregator website Metacritic. Rick Florino of Artistdirect stated "Ultimately, this is a milestone for Stone Sour and for modern rock music. It's on par with Alice in Chains' Dirt, Metallica's Master of Puppets, Queens of the Stone Age's Songs for the Deaf, Soundgarden's Superunknown, and any other game-changing albums you can think of," and awarded the album 5 out of 5.

Big Cheese also rated the album 5 out of 5, stating "Perhaps what's most immediate upon listening to 'House of Gold & Bones' is the sheer step up that Stone Sour have made as musicians. The likes of 'RU486' and 'Tired' simply would not have been possible if they'd been attempted by the band in their 2006 'Come What(ever) May' period. Simply astounding."

Rock Sound from the UK gave the album 8 out of 10 and said "songs like roof-raising anthem 'Absolute Zero', the frenetic, thrashy 'RU 486' and acoustic lament 'Taciturn' deserve to be heard within the context of the entirety of this mightily ambitious, versatile record."

Allmusic said of the album "the album follows an arc both thematically and sonically, with the intensity of the songs rising and falling in a way that feels more like a musical than an album of chest-thumping hard rock. This creates a nice dynamic between songs like the driving "My Name Is Allen" and its follow-up, the more contemplative and reflective "Taciturn," creating a palpable shift that comes through both lyrically and musically."

Track listing
All lyrics written by Corey Taylor, all music composed by Stone Sour.

Personnel

Stone Sour
 Corey Taylor − lead vocals, piano on track 10, gang vocals on track 6
 James Root − guitar, backing vocals on track 11
 Josh Rand  − guitar
 Roy Mayorga  − drums, synthesizer on tracks 1, 2, 8, 9

Additional musicians
 Rachel Bolan  − bass guitar
 Kevin Fox − strings arrangement on tracks 4 and 5, cello on tracks 4 and 5
 Karen Graves − first violin on tracks 4 and 5
 Kate Unrau − second violin on tracks 4 and 5
 Anna Redekop − viola on tracks 4 and 5
 Stubs − gang vocals on track 6
 Lady − gang vocals on track 6
 Truck − gang vocals on track 6
 Sinner − gang vocals on track 6
 Ty Reveen − voice of "Reveen the Impossiblist"

Technical personnel
 David Bottrill − producer, digital editing
 Michael Phillips − engineering, digital editing
 Ryan Martin − assistant
 Martin Connors − guitar tech, bass tech
 Kevin Miles − guitar tech
 Jonathan Nicholson − drum tech
 Jeff Ocheltree − drum tech
 Jay Ruston − mixing
 James Ingram − assistant
 Spike − assistant
 Paul Logus − mastering
 Kevin Dietz − engineering (for string arrangements)
 Monte Conner − A&R

Art personnel
 Chapman Baehler − photography
 Sean Mosher-Smith − art direction, design, photography

Charts

References

External links
 House of Gold & Bones – Part 1 at Roadrunner Records

2012 albums
Stone Sour albums
Roadrunner Records albums
Albums produced by David Bottrill
Albums recorded at Metalworks Studios